The men's 200 metre backstroke event at the 2020 Summer Olympics was held from 28 to 30 July 2021 at the Tokyo Aquatics Centre. There will be approximately 30 competitors from approximately 20 nations, with the ultimate numbers determined through the ongoing selection process, including universality places.

Background

This was the 16th appearance of the 200 metre backstroke event. It was first held in 1900. The event did not return until 1964; since then, it has been on the programme at every Summer Games. From 1904 to 1960, a men's 100 metre backstroke was held instead. In 1964, only the 200 metres was held. Beginning in 1968 and ever since, both the 100 and 200 metre versions have been held.

Of the 2016 finalists, defending Olympic champion Ryan Murphy returned, along with bronze medalist Evgeny Rylov of Russia (competing under the ROC banner), fourth-place finisher Xu Jiayu of China, seventh-place finisher Christian Diener of Germany, and eighth-place finisher (and 2012 silver medalist) Ryosuke Irie of Japan. Rylov had won the 2017 and 2019 World Championships with Murphy finishing second both times.

Qualification

 
The Olympic Qualifying Time for the event was 1:57.50. Up to two swimmers per National Olympic Committee (NOC) could automatically qualify by swimming that time at an approved qualification event. The Olympic Selection Time was 2:01.03. Up to one swimmer per NOC meeting that time was eligible for selection, allocated by world ranking until the maximum quota for all swimming events was reached. NOCs without a male swimmer qualified in any event could also use their universality place.

Competition format

The competition consisted of three rounds: heats, semifinals, and a final. The swimmers with the best 16 times in the heats advanced to the semifinals. The swimmers with the best 8 times in the semifinals advanced to the final. Swim-offs were used as necessary to break ties for advancement to the next round.

Records

Prior to this competition, the existing world and Olympic records were as follows.

The following records was established during the competition:

Schedule
All times are Japan Standard Time (UTC+9)

Results

Heats
The swimmers with the top 16 times, regardless of heat, advance to the semifinals.

Semifinals
The swimmers with the best 8 times, regardless of heat, advanced to the final.

Final

References

Men's 00200 metre backstroke
Olympics
200 metre backstroke at the Olympics
Men's events at the 2020 Summer Olympics